Labidochromis maculicauda is a species of cichlid endemic to Lake Malawi where it is only known from the northwestern coast. This species can reach a length of  SL. It can also be found in the aquarium trade.

References

maculicauda
Fish described in 1982
Fish of Lake Malawi
Cichlid fish of Africa
Taxonomy articles created by Polbot